The Bangladesh Premier League (BPL) is a professional Twenty20 cricket league in Bangladesh. The league consists of six teams from different cities. This is a list of the squads of all franchises for the 2015 edition.

Barisal Bulls 
Barisal Bulls team roster for 2015:

Comilla Victorians 
Comilla Victorians team roster for 2015:

Chittagong Vikings 
Chittagong Vikings team roster for 2015:

Dhaka Dynamites 
Dhaka Dynamites team roster for 2015:

Rangpur Riders 
Rangpur Riders team roster for 2015:

Sylhet Super Stars 
Sylhet Super Stars team roster for 2015:

References 

2015 Bangladesh Premier League